There is no present signed state-numbered highway numbered 26 in the U.S. state of Oregon. Oregon Highway 26 may refer to:
U.S. Route 26 in Oregon
U.S. Route 20 in Oregon, known in Oregon as Oregon Route 26 from 1932 to 1943 
Mount Hood Highway, also known as Mount Hood Highway No. 26